Brodek u Prostějova is a market town in Prostějov District in the Olomouc Region of the Czech Republic. It has about 1,500 inhabitants.

Administrative parts
The village of Sněhotice is an administrative part of Brodek u Prostějova.

History
The first written mention of Brodek is from 1334. In the 14th century, the settlement was promoted to a market town. Brodek was destroyed by the Taborites during the Hussite Wars in 1430, and then by French army in 1805 and 1809 during the Napoleonic Wars, but it always recovered thanks to its convenient location on a busy road.

In 1960, Sněhotice was joined to Brodek u Prostějova.

References

Populated places in Prostějov District
Market towns in the Czech Republic